Edwin Hugh Shellard (usually known as E. H. Shellard) was an English architect who worked from an office in Manchester, and who flourished between 1844 and 1864.  Most of his output was in the design of churches in Northwest England, and he was successful in gaining at least 13 contracts for Commissioners' churches.  The Commissioners' churches in the list are denoted by †.

Key

Works

References

Bibliography

Shellard, E. H.